is a 1985 Japanese drama film directed by Sadao Nakajima. It was entered into the 35th Berlin International Film Festival.

Cast
 Kenichi Hagiwara as Hajime Kinoshita
 Yumiko Fujita as Kuni
 Michiko Kohno as Hide
 Takashi Naitô as Kazuo
 Ai Saotome as Hana
 Eiko Nagashima as Mitsu
 Taiji Tonoyama as Kamezo
 Ken Mitsuishi as Jiro
 Hideo Murota as Kuzushiri
 Rei Okamoto as Tome
 Asao Uchida as Ayutachi
 Nenji Kobayashi as Army
 Yoshio Ichikawa as Imasuke

References

External links

1985 films
1980s Japanese-language films
1985 drama films
Films directed by Sadao Nakajima
Japanese drama films
1980s Japanese films